William Wilson was an English professional footballer who played as a right back.

Career
Born in South Shields, Wilson played for South Shields, Newcastle United and Bradford City. For Newcastle United, he made 4 appearances in the Football League. For Bradford City, he made 58 appearances in the Football League; he also made 5 FA Cup appearances.

Sources

References

Year of birth missing
Year of death missing
English footballers
South Shields F.C. (1889) players
Newcastle United F.C. players
Bradford City A.F.C. players
English Football League players
Association football fullbacks
Footballers from South Shields